The .600/577 Rewa, also known as the .600/577 Rewa Nitro Express, Holland's .600/577 and the .577 Rewa, is an obsolete big bore rifle cartridge.

Overview
The .600/577 Rewa was developed and introduced by Holland & Holland in 1929 by a special order for Martand Singh, Maharaja of Rewa.

The .600/577 Rewa is a rimmed, bottlenecked centerfire rifle cartridge. The .600/577 Rewa is derived from the .600 Nitro Express necked down to accept the  calibre bullet of the .577 Nitro Express.

Always rare, the .600/577 Rewa was produced by Holland & Holland until 1957, although it can still be purchased from Kynoch.

See also
 13 mm caliber
 Nitro Express
 List of rifle cartridges

References

External links
 Royal Armouries, "Centrefire rifle proof cartridge - .577 in Rewa by Kynoch", collections.royalarmouries.org, retrieved 15 June 2018.

Pistol and rifle cartridges
British firearm cartridges
Holland & Holland cartridges
Weapons and ammunition introduced in 1929